Carabus jankowskii is a species of beetle from family Carabidae. The species are black coloured with brown pronotum.
Carabus jankowskii can be found in Russia, China, North Korea, and South Korea. <ref.</ref>

Subspecies include:
 Carabus jankowskii jankowskii
 Carabus jankowskii taebeagsanensis

References

jankowskii
Beetles described in 1883